Sir Joseph Henry Greer   (1 February 1855 – 25 August 1933) was an Irish soldier, politician, and racing horse owner and breeder. He was born in County Tyrone, was educated at Wellington and joined the 7th Highlanders after military college. He was appointed as Director of the Irish National Stud in 1915. He also became the Aga Khan III's first stud manager. He received a knighthood in the 1925 Birthday Honours.

He was an independent member of Seanad Éireann from 1922 to 1928. He was nominated to the Seanad by the President of the Executive Council in 1922 for 6 years. He did not contest the 1928 Seanad election.

References

1855 births
1933 deaths
Independent members of Seanad Éireann
Members of the 1922 Seanad
Members of the 1925 Seanad
Politicians from County Tyrone
Knights Commander of the Royal Victorian Order